Viktor Galović (born 19 September 1990) is a former Croatian tennis player. Galović has a career high ATP singles ranking of 173, achieved on 14 May 2018. Galović had previously represented Italy where he was raised but in 2014 switched back to his home country of Croatia.

Career
Galović made his ATP main draw singles debut at the 2014 Bet-at-home Cup Kitzbühel where he qualified for the main draw, defeating Philipp Davydenko, Lukáš Dlouhý and Antonio Veić en route. In the main draw he lost to Albert Ramos-Viñolas in three sets in the first round.

Galović had his grass debut in Stuttgart where he lost in the second round of qualifications to Denis Kudla. But he was lucky and he received an entry as a lucky loser. In the first round of the ATP tournament in Stuttgart he lost to Maximilian Marterer 6:3,4:6,1:6.

Galović retired in July 2021 due to continuous back and hip injuries.

Davis cup 

Galović represented Croatia two times in Davis cup. First time on 17 September in Bogota, Colombia, where he beat Alejandro Gonzalez 6:4,2:6,6:2.

Second time in Osijek, Croatia in the first round of Davis cup main draw. Croatia played against Canada. He played against Denis Shapovalov on 2 February 2018 and lost 4:6,4:6,2:6.

Galović was on the list of the Croatian players in the quarters of Davis cup where he supported Croatia against Kazakhstan.

Performance timeline

Singles

ATP Challenger and ITF Futures finals

Singles: 11 (4–7)

Doubles: 8 (4–4)

References

External links

1990 births
Living people
Croatian male tennis players
People from Nova Gradiška
Italian male tennis players
Naturalised citizens of Italy
Naturalised tennis players
Italian people of Croatian descent